Emamzadeh Aqil may refer to:

Emamzadeh Aqil, Fars
Emamzadeh Aqil, Tehran